Texas A&M AgriLife is the organization the connects agriculture and life sciences programs at Texas A&M University and the Texas A&M University System.

This partnership allows for collaboration between its 5 state agriculture agencies:

 Texas A&M College of Agriculture and Life Sciences
 Texas A&M AgriLife Research
 Texas A&M AgriLife Extension Service
 Texas A&M Forest Service
 Texas Veterinary Medical Diagnostic Laboratory.

External links
 

Texas A&M University System
AgriLife, Texas AandM